Bellona was built in Spain in 1797 and was taken in prize circa late 1804. She made one voyage as a privateer, sailing from Liverpool to the River Plate area. On her return she made a voyage as a slave ship in the triangular trade in enslaved people. She was wrecked as she was coming back into Liverpool after having delivered her captives to Charleston.

Career
Bellona first appeared in Lloyd's Register (LR) in the volume for 1805.

Though the listing suggests that her owners intended to sail Bellona as on an enslaving voyage, she sailed as a privateer instead. On 27 November 1804 Captain Samuel Hensley acquired a letter of marque. Less than a month later, Captain William Dean acquired a letter of marque on 14 December.

The size of the crews and the amount of armament suggest that all three were privateers. Antelope had sprung her foremast and was going to put into St Catherine's to repair. The information for the news came via Bellona. She had returned to Liverpool on 9 September 1805, "from a cruise".

Bellona owners published in Billinge's Advertiser on 30 September 1805, a correspondence with Captain Dean. Messers. Lake and Brown, of the Liverpool Packet Office stated that they and the owners were giving Dean a gift of £100, "notwithstanding that you have been unsuccessful" in recognition of his efforts on his last cruise.  In response, Dean had written a letter thanking them.

Captain William Lace replaced Dean as master of Bellona and acquired a letter of marque on 16 December. He sailed from Liverpool on 1 February 1806, bound for Africa. Later she was reported at Savannah from Africa, having lost her anchors and cable. She arrived at Charleston in September with some 233 captives. She sailed for Liverpool on 25 September.

Fate
As Bellona, Lace, master, was arriving at Liverpool from Charleston, she ran ashore at "the Rock". The next report was that she had gone ashore at the Hoyle Bank and was totally lost. Her crew was saved.

Citations

References
 

1797 ships
Ships built in Spain
Captured ships
Age of Sail merchant ships of England
Privateer ships of the United Kingdom
Liverpool slave ships
Maritime incidents in 1806